Trevor John Scott (born August 30, 1984) is a former American football defensive end who played in the National Football Place (NFL). He played college football at Buffalo and was drafted by the Oakland Raiders in the sixth round of the 2008 NFL Draft.

Early years  
Scott was twice an All-Northern selection at his high school Potsdam High playing tight end and outside linebacker. He earned two letters and was twice a captain and was team MVP as both a junior and senior and was a Watertown Daily Times First-team selection. He also earned four letters in track and field and two in basketball.

College career 
At the University at Buffalo, Scott was an All-Conference selection as a senior he started all 12 games at left end for the Bulls had 10 sacks, 46 tackles and 15 tackles for a loss.  In 2006, as a junior, he started all 12 games at defensive end and led the Bulls with nine sacks on the season and also recorded 45 total tackles. In 2005, he played in seven games as a reserve tight end and had eight catches for 55 yards on the season.  The prior season, 2004, he played in  10 games after  being a redshirt in 2003.

Professional career

Oakland Raiders

He was a 6th round pick (169th overall) in the 2008 NFL Draft. Scott recorded his first and second career NFL sack on October 19, 2008 when he brought down Brett Favre.  That performance earned him a nomination for the NFL Rookie of the Week award, but the award was given to Chris Johnson. Scott finished the 2008 season with 24 tackles, a forced fumble, and tied two others for the most sacks by a rookie with 5.0.

On, November 25, 2010, Scott was placed on injured reserve by the Raiders, due to an injured anterior cruciate ligament in his left knee, ending his season after 10 games, 22 tackles, and 1.5 sacks.  He played in all 16 games the following season.

New England Patriots
Scott signed with the New England Patriots on March 17, 2012. Played the 2012 season with the New England Patriots and recorded 3 sacks, 5 tackles, and a forced fumble.

Tampa Bay Buccaneers
Scott signed with the Tampa Bay Buccaneers on August 20, 2013.

Chicago Bears
Scott was signed by the Chicago Bears on March 6, 2014.

Personal life
Scott Is Married to Dana Scott they have a son Jack Christopher Scott Born 11/2014

References

External links
 Tampa Bay Buccaneers bio

1984 births
Living people
American football defensive ends
American football linebackers
Buffalo Bulls football players
Chicago Bears players
New England Patriots players
Oakland Raiders players
Tampa Bay Buccaneers players
People from Potsdam, New York
Players of American football from New York (state)
Ed Block Courage Award recipients